Le diable l'emporte ("May the devil take him") is a 1948 novel by the French writer René Barjavel. It revolves a future world war with devastating weapon technology, which forces the last surviving humans to live deep underground in a secret vault. The book has a pessimistic message about technology and celebrates the down-to-earth man and traditional farmer.

References

1948 science fiction novels
1948 French novels
Apocalyptic novels
Éditions Denoël books
French science fiction novels
French-language novels
Novels by René Barjavel
French post-apocalyptic novels